Kamienica may refer to:

Kamienica (architecture), a type of tenement building especially prevalent in Poland
Kamienica (river), a river in south-western Poland
Kamienica, Kłodzko County in Lower Silesian Voivodeship (south-west Poland)
Kamienica, Jawor County in Lower Silesian Voivodeship (south-west Poland)
Kamienica, Gmina Dobrzyń nad Wisłą in Kuyavian-Pomeranian Voivodeship (north-central Poland)
Kamienica, Tuchola County in Kuyavian-Pomeranian Voivodeship (north-central Poland)
Kamienica, Gmina Skępe in Kuyavian-Pomeranian Voivodeship (north-central Poland)
Kamienica, Podlaskie Voivodeship (north-east Poland)
Kamienica, Pomeranian Voivodeship  (north Poland)
Kamienica, Bytów County in Pomeranian Voivodeship
Kamienica, Limanowa County in Lesser Poland Voivodeship (south Poland)
Kamienica, Miechów County in Lesser Poland Voivodeship (south Poland)
Kamienica, Masovian Voivodeship (east-central Poland)
Kamienica, Konin County in Greater Poland Voivodeship (west-central Poland)
Kamienica, Wągrowiec County in Greater Poland Voivodeship (west-central Poland)
Kamienica, Silesian Voivodeship (south Poland)
Kamienica, Opole Voivodeship (south-west Poland)
Kamienica, Bielsko-Biała (district of Bielsko-Biała, south Poland)

See also
Kamenica (disambiguation)
Kamenitsa (disambiguation)
Kamenitza
Kamenicky (disambiguation)